Mark William Buesgens (born May 14, 1961) is a Minnesota politician and former member of the Minnesota House of Representatives representing District 35B, which includes portions of Scott County in the southern Twin Cities metropolitan area.  A Republican, he is an educator by profession, and is currently the business manager for the Saint Paul Conservatory for Performing Artists in Saint Paul.

Service in the Minnesota House
Buesgens was first elected in 1998, and was re-elected every two years since then until retiring in 2012. He was a member of the House Finance Committee, on which he was the ranking minority party member, and the State and Local Government Operations Reform, Technology and Elections Committee. He also served on the Finance subcommittees for the Early Childhood Finance and Policy Division and the K-12 Education Finance Division, and on the State and Local Government Operations Reform, Technology and Elections Subcommittee for the Local Government Division. His legislative priorities included tax cuts, education reform, and local control of government decision-making. On May 21, 2011, he joined the House Republican Majority in voting for a constitutional amendment to define marriage as between a man and woman.

Education, background, community service

References

External links 

 Rep. Buesgens Web Page
 Minnesota Public Radio Votetracker: Rep. Mark Buesgens
 Project Votesmart - Rep. Mark Buesgens Profile

1961 births
Living people
People from Shakopee, Minnesota
Republican Party members of the Minnesota House of Representatives
Minnesota State University, Mankato alumni
Schoolteachers from Minnesota
21st-century American politicians
People from Jordan, Minnesota